Accept No Substitutes is the second album by Portland, Oregon-based R&B group Pleasure. It was released in 1976 and produced by jazz trombonist Wayne Henderson of The Crusaders.

Track listing
"Let's Dance" – 5:01
"I'm Mad" – 3:10
"Pleasure For Your Pleasure" – 3:47
"We Have So Much" – 3:29
"Jammin' With Pleasure" – 2:26
"Ghettos Of The Mind" – 5:05
"The Love Of My Life" – 4:05
"Theme For The Moonchild" – 5:25
"2 For 1" – 4:22

Personnel
Marlon "The Magician" McClain - guitar, lead and backing vocals
Sherman Davis - lead and backing vocals
Bruce Carter - drums
Nathaniel Phillips - electric bass, backing vocals
Dan Brewster - trombone
Donald Hepburn - keyboards, backing vocals
Dennis Springer - soprano saxophone, tenor saxophone
Bruce Smith - congas, bell tree, Flexitone drums, cabasa, bells, tambourine, backing vocals, bird call effects
Jerry Peters - electric piano, Clavinet
Michael Hepburn - electric piano, string ensemble
Oscar Brashear - trumpet, flugelhorn
Augie Johnson, Sylvia Nabors - backing vocals

Charts

Singles

References

External links
 Pleasure-Accept No Substitutes at Discogs

1976 albums
Pleasure (American band) albums
Albums produced by Wayne Henderson (musician)
Fantasy Records albums